Lee Se-Young (born April 28, 1989) is a South Korean comedian and actress. She is best known as a host on the tvN's entertainment show SNL Korea.

Personal life 
Lee plans to marry her non-celebrity boyfriend who is Korean-Japanese. They are expected to get married in January 2022.

Filmography

Television shows

References

External links
 

1989 births
Living people
South Korean women comedians
South Korean television actresses
People from Incheon
Duksung Women's University alumni
FNC Entertainment artists